Helton da Silva Arruda (born 18 May 1978), known simply as Helton, is a Brazilian former footballer who played as a goalkeeper.

After starting out at Vasco da Gama he went on to spend his professional career in Portugal, representing União de Leiria and Porto and winning 18 major titles for the latter club. Over 14 seasons, he appeared in 299 Primeira Liga games.

Helton appeared for Brazil at the 2007 Copa América.

Club career

Vasco
Born in São Gonçalo, Rio de Janeiro, Helton emerged through CR Vasco da Gama's youth system. He first attracted attention after winning the Série A and the Copa Mercosur with the club in 2000.

União de Leiria
In 2002, Helton's contract with Vasco expired and he signed with Portuguese club U.D. Leiria in January of the following year. He made his official debut on 9 March 2003 in a 3–1 home win against Académica de Coimbra for the Taça de Portugal, and backed up Paulo Costinha in his first season.

At the end of the 2004–05 campaign, after being first-choice in his last two years, Helton signed with FC Porto.

Porto
It seemed that Helton was destined to spend a long time bench-warming, as Porto legend Vítor Baía barred his way into the first team. However, he got his chance sooner than expected when Dutch coach Co Adriaanse summarily dropped Baía after a mistake against C.F. Estrela da Amadora cost the team a goal and a 1–2 away defeat, on 15 January 2006.

After initial criticism, Helton gained the number one spot with several solid performances. He celebrated his first season at the club with the domestic double (Primeira Liga and cup).

Helton continued to be an undisputed starter for Porto in the following years, as Porto won four consecutive league championships. In 2008–09's Portuguese Cup, however, he stayed on the bench as Nuno Espírito Santo was the starter for the eventual winners.

Helton was again first-choice in the following two seasons, appearing in a combined 49 league games as his team won six major titles. On 18 May 2011 he celebrated his 33rd birthday by keeping a clean sheet in the UEFA Europa League final, in a 1–0 win against fellow league side S.C. Braga; following the departure of Lucho González for Olympique de Marseille in summer 2009, he was also appointed team captain.

Helton played 30 league matches in the 2012–13 campaign, for his seventh league conquest. On 16 March 2014, however, the 35-year-old suffered an achilles tendon injury to his right leg during a 0–1 loss at Sporting CP, being sidelined for several months.

On 17 February 2014, Helton was condemned to pay a €60,000 fine for assaulting two stewards at the Estádio da Luz, following a tunnel brawl during the 0–1 away league loss against S.L. Benfica on 20 December 2009. After returning to action he played second-fiddle, to both Fabiano and Iker Casillas.

After terminating his contract on 12 October 2016 at the age of 38, Helton announced his retirement the following year, but returned shortly after to play as a forward for the veteran side of amateurs SC Canidelo. He started his coaching career in January 2018, being appointed at Portuguese third division club S.C. Freamunde.

Helton came out of retirement in October 2020, returning to União Leiria who now competed in the third tier.

International career
After competing at the 1997 FIFA World Youth Championship, Helton was a member of the Brazilian team at the 2000 Summer Olympics. He appeared in all four matches, before the nation was eliminated in the quarter-finals by Cameroon.

Helton received his first callup to the full side in October 2006, starting in an unofficial exhibition game against Kuwait club Al Kuwait Kaifan on 7 October 2006. His official debut came on 15 November of the same year when he started in a friendly with Switzerland, and he was also featured against England in June 2007, in what was the first international to be played at the new Wembley Stadium.

Helton was a member of the national squad who won the 2007 Copa América, but did not make one single appearance in the tournament as he was second choice to A.S. Roma's Doni.

Career statistics

Club

International

Honours
Vasco da Gama
Campeonato Brasileiro Série A: 2000
Campeonato Carioca: 1998
Copa Mercosur: 2000
Taça Guanabara: 2000
Taça Rio: 2001

Porto
Primeira Liga: 2005–06, 2006–07, 2007–08, 2008–09, 2010–11, 2011–12, 2012–13
Taça de Portugal: 2005–06, 2008–09, 2009–10, 2010–11
Supertaça Cândido de Oliveira: 2006, 2009, 2010, 2011, 2012, 2013
UEFA Europa League: 2010–11

Brazil
Copa América: 2007

Individual
Primeira Liga Goalkeeper of the Year: 2010–11, 2012–13

References

External links
Porto official profile 

1978 births
Living people
People from São Gonçalo, Rio de Janeiro
Sportspeople from Rio de Janeiro (state)
Brazilian footballers
Association football goalkeepers
Campeonato Brasileiro Série A players
CR Vasco da Gama players
Primeira Liga players
Campeonato de Portugal (league) players
U.D. Leiria players
FC Porto players
UEFA Europa League winning players
Brazil youth international footballers
Brazil under-20 international footballers
Brazil international footballers
2007 Copa América players
Copa América-winning players
Olympic footballers of Brazil
Footballers at the 2000 Summer Olympics
Brazilian expatriate footballers
Expatriate footballers in Portugal
Brazilian expatriate sportspeople in Portugal
Brazilian football managers
S.C. Freamunde managers
Brazilian expatriate football managers
Expatriate football managers in Portugal